The term Qingzhen can also refer to Chinese Muslims, Chinese Islamic cuisine or the Hui ethnic group.

Qingzhen is a county-level city under the administration of Guiyang, the capital of Guizhou Province, China. It is located to the west of Guiyang's urban core, bordering Huaxi District to the southeast, the districts of Guanshanhu and Baiyun to the east and Xiuwen County to the northeast.

Climate

References

External links
Official website of Qingzhen Government
Official Guiyang Website

Cities in Guizhou
Guiyang
County-level divisions of Guizhou